The Tribune Chronicle is a daily morning newspaper serving Warren, Ohio and the Mahoning Valley area of the United States.  The newspaper claims to be the second oldest in the U.S. state of Ohio.  The Trib, as the newspaper is nicknamed by readers and in other local media, is owned by Ogden Newspapers Inc. of Wheeling, West Virginia.  The Tribune Chronicle is published by Charles Jarvis, and its editor is Brenda Linert.  In 2008, USA Today reported daily circulation of 35,471 for the Tribune Chronicle.

History
In June 1812, the Trump of Fame commenced publishing as the first newspaper in what had been the Connecticut Western Reserve.  In 1816, this paper became known as the Western Reserve Chronicle, forerunner to the modern Tribune Chronicle. On April 14, 1883, the Chronicle commenced daily publication.  Prior to this, the newspaper had been a weekly, publishing on Tuesdays.

The Chronicle merged with The Warren Tribune on April 26, 1924 to become The Warren Tribune Chronicle.  In 1977, the newspaper changed to its present name, and began publishing on Sundays.  On November 2, 1994, the paper's online edition premiered, the first in the Mahoning Valley.  The newspaper also became the first morning newspaper in Trumbull County, on July 6, 1999.

Expansion
On August 16, 2019, The Vindicator and Tribune Chronicle reached an agreement for the Tribune Chronicle to acquire The Vindicator’s subscription list, The Vindicator masthead and the Vindy.com domain, according to The Vindicator former general manager Mark Brown. As of September 1, 2019 Tribune Chronicle now publishes The Vindicator for the Mahoning County region. Trumbull County residents will remain getting the paper as Tribune Chronicle

References

Newspapers published in Ohio
Warren, Ohio